Noor Riyadh ("Riyadh Light" in Arabic) is an annual light and art festival that illuminates Riyadh, Saudi Arabia's capital city. Considered the largest light art festival of its kind in the world, it falls under the umbrella of Riyadh Art, a project launched by King Salman bin Abdulaziz Al Saud as an initiative of Crown Prince Mohammed bin Salman bin Abdulaziz to transform the Saudi capital into an open art exhibition.

Noor Riyadh Launch 
Noor Riyadh kicked off its inaugural edition in March 2021 at the Saudi National Museum and King Abdullah Financial District under the theme "Under One Sky," examining the human tendency to view light from an artistic and creative point of view. The event saw an ensemble of pioneering artists hailing from 20 countries, 40% of them Saudi artists, present 60 historic, visual, and engineering artworks in the form of sculptures, light shows, immersive experiences, kinetic art, and outdoor installations. The festival also included a retrospective art exhibition by 30 artists titled Light Upon Light, which tracked the progress of light art since the 1960s.

Noor Riyadh Second Edition 
Noor Riyadh's second edition was held in November 2022 under the theme "We Dream of New Horizons," symbolizing optimism and trust in the Saudi Arabia's path-breaking transformation and renewal journey. Based in four key locations across Riyadh, the festival delved into how light has evolved to play a role in shaping our worldly relations. The Saudi capital was lit up across 40 different sites, thanks to 130 artists (34% of them local talent) who brought to life 190 light artworks, including 90 pieces that went on display for the first time.

The event featured a charity auction where works by leading Saudi artists went under the hammer, with proceeds going to various art programs run by nonprofit foundations.

Major Light Shows

Star in Motion 
One of Noor Riyadh's standout installations, the Belgian artist Koert Vermeulen's creation featured a five-tonne star hanging from a height of 256 metres atop the Kingdom Tower, symbolizing stellar movement, with the light installation moving at the start of each hour for a minute to represent the lifecycle of a star from birth to extinction.

The Order of Chaos: Chaos in Order 
Another masterpiece that graced the festival was by American artist Mark Brickman. Inspired by the city of Riyadh, over 2000 drones were used in this work. It also claimed a Guinness World Record for the highest number of drones that took part in an art show.

Pulse of Light 
Conceptualized by French artist Yann Kersalé, Pulse of Light was a night-time laser show that started from three skyscrapers in Riyadh and intersected in the night sky to create a bridge of gleaming rays connecting the Kingdom Tower, Faisaliah Tower, and Majdoul Tower. The show could be viewed from anywhere in the city and received four Guinness World Records for the longest distance covered for a light laser display, biggest light laser display, highest laser show, and largest display on a building interface.

See also 

 Jenadriyah
 Riyadh Season
 Riyadh International Book Fair

References 

2021 establishments in Saudi Arabia
Festivals established in 2021
Annual events in Saudi Arabia
Festivals in Saudi Arabia
Culture in Riyadh